The Women's 4x100 Freestyle Relay swimming event at the 2009 SEA Games was held on December 11, 2009. Of note, in the event's final, the top-3 teams all swam faster than the then-Games Record in the event.

Results

Final

References

Swimming at the 2009 Southeast Asian Games
2009 in women's swimming